Professor Algirdas Budrys (born March 3, 1939) is a Lithuanian musician and head of the wind department of the Lithuanian Music Academy.

Primarily a clarinetist, Budrys has recorded more than 50 LPs and has made over a hundred radio recordings with a repertoire that included all the principal classical and chamber ensemble works for clarinet from Mozart to contemporary composers.

Budrys has given concerts in all former Soviet republics, as well as in Hungary, Poland, the Czech Republic, Germany, Finland, France, Egypt, Great Britain and the United States.

For his efforts to improve Lithuanian culture and art, Budrys was awarded a fourth-degree Order of the Lithuanian Grand Duke Gediminas in 1999.

Footnotes

References
  prof. Algirdas Budrys, klarnetininkas. Lithuanian Music Academy. Retrieved 2010-12-21.

Living people
Clarinetists
Music educators
1939 births
Musicians from Vilnius
Officer's Crosses of the Order of the Lithuanian Grand Duke Gediminas
Academic staff of the Lithuanian Academy of Music and Theatre
21st-century clarinetists